Cham Gerdab (also Romanized as Cham Gerdāb, Cham-e Gerdāb, Chām-e Qerdāb, and Cham-ī-Gīrdāb) is a village in Jelogir Rural District, in the Central District of Pol-e Dokhtar County, Lorestan Province, Iran. At the 2006 census, its population was 279, in 56 families.

References 

Towns and villages in Pol-e Dokhtar County